The 2017–18 WPI Engineers men's basketball team represented Worcester Polytechnic Institute during the 2017–18 NCAA Division III men's basketball season. They were coached by a 20-year coaching veteran, Chris Bartely. The Engineers played their home games at Harrington Auditorium in Worcester, Massachusetts and competed in the  New England Women's and Men's Athletic Conference (NEWMAC). They finished the regular season 14–11, 8–6 in the NEWMAC play to finish in fourth place. They lost in the finals of the NEWMAC Tournament to MIT.

Previous season

The Engineers finished the regular season with a 16-9 record, lost 61-63 to MIT in the Semifinal round of the NEWMAC Tournament, and failed to qualify for the 2017 NCAA Men's Division III basketball tournament.

References

WPI Engineers men's basketball seasons